Tjällmo is a locality situated in Motala Municipality, Östergötland County, Sweden with 557 inhabitants in 2010.

Riksdag elections

References 

Populated places in Östergötland County
Populated places in Motala Municipality